Erythropitta is a genus of pitta. The members of the genus are found mostly in South-east Asia, with one species, the Papuan pitta, ranging into northeast Australia. The genus was formerly merged with the large genus Pitta, but a 2006 study split the family into three genera.

Taxonomy
The pittas were at one time all usually placed in the genus Pitta, the only genus in the family Pittidae, but when a 2006 molecular phylogenetic study found that the pittas formed three separate groups, the genus was split and some species were moved into two resurrected genera, Erythropitta and Hydrornis. The genus Erythropitta had been introduced in 1854 by the French naturalist Charles Lucien Bonaparte. The type species was subsequently designated as the Papuan pitta (Erythropitta macklotii). The name Erythropitta combines the Ancient Greek word eruthros "red" with the genus name Pitta.

Pittas in this genus have red or crimson coloured underparts, greenish or blueish backs and short tails. They are mostly small in size.

Species
The genus contains the following 15-17 species:

References

 
Bird genera
 
Taxa named by Charles Lucien Bonaparte